Sachem Wilson (born 24 October 1994 in the United States) is an American soccer player.

References

American soccer players
Living people
Association football forwards
1994 births
Carrick Rangers F.C. players